William Conner Eldridge Jr. (born September 9, 1977) is an American lawyer and politician who served as [United States Attorney]] for the Western District of Arkansas. He is a member of the Democratic Party and was his party's nominee for the 2016 U.S. Senate election in Arkansas.

Personal life and education
Eldridge was born in Fayetteville, Arkansas in 1977. He lived in Augusta, Arkansas for twelve years before moving to Lonoke, Arkansas, where he worked on his family's farm. He graduated from Lonoke High School and earned a bachelor's degree from Davidson College in North Carolina 1999. He graduated with a Juris Doctor from the University of Arkansas in 2003, where he was also a member of the Law Review.

Eldridge is the son-in-law of Ross Whipple, the former owner of Summit Bank. He and his wife, Mary Elizabeth, have three boys: Will, Henry, and Tull.

Career
Eldridge served as a law clerk for G. Thomas Eisele; a legislative assistant for Congressman Marion Berry; and a legislative correspondent for Senator Blanche Lincoln. While serving as a legislative aide, Eldridge focused primarily on agricultural issues.

On the brink of starting a career as an attorney in 2004, Eldridge's father-in-law, Ross Whipple, made Eldridge an offer that caused him to detour into banking. Eldridge was named president of Arkadelphia's Summit Bank in July 2005 and joined the board of directors in March 2006. From 2006 to 2008, Eldridge served as corporate executive vice president and senior counsel, and from 2008 to 2010 Eldridge served as chief executive officer for the bank. Eldridge became special deputy prosecutor for the Prosecuting Attorney's Office of Clark County in 2009.

United States Attorney
After a unanimous confirmation by the U.S. Senate, Eldridge became the US Attorney for the Western District of Arkansas in 2010.  As a federal prosecutor, Eldridge was an aggressive prosecutor of child abusers, drug traffickers and fraudsters. In 2014, Eldridge successfully prosecuted Brandon Barber, a former Northwest Arkansas developer, who developed schemes to defraud banks, creditors and the Federal Bankruptcy Court. Barber received a 65-month federal sentence for bank fraud and money laundering.

Child abuse cases
During his time as a U.S. Attorney, Eldridge prosecuted over 100 child abusers and pornographers. Eldridge's office saw individuals convicted on charges of child abuse, including transporting minors with the intent to engage in sexual activity, possession of child pornography and production of child pornography. Eldridge underscored the importance of these convictions, stating, "There is no higher priority in our office than protecting our children." 

Eldridge also sought to fight child abuse proactively by providing information to parents about how to protect their child, and how to be an advocate for the communities on child abuse.

A-Chance Program
In an effort to combat child abuse and help children in violent and crime-ridden homes succeed in their school setting and in life, Eldridge launched the A-Chance program in August 2014. Eldridge found that children across Arkansas are exposed to unconscionable situations, and he saw this program as a meaningful step to "truly change the cycle of violence in our communities."

The A-Chance ("Arkansas Cultivating Healthy Attitudes and Nurturing Children to Excel") program allows the police working a domestic violence or crime scene in a home involving school age children to contact the children’s school officials by early the next morning with a “Handle with Care Notice.” Eldridge said the notification allows teachers and administrators insight that better helps them address the needs of those children. The program seeks to provide proper care for children following these traumatic events, empowering students to excel in school and break this cycle of violence.

"Operation Crystal Clear"
Beginning in 2011, agents with the FBI and FBI Task Force initiated an investigation, known as “Operation Crystal Clear”, into Jamie Martin and his drug trafficking organization. During the investigation, agents identified Martin as a source of supply in Columbia County, Arkansas. Pursuant to a court order, agents intercepted the wire and electronic communications of a cell phone used by Jamie Martin. Over the course of the court-ordered interception, investigators received numerous wire and electronic communications between Martin and his co-conspirators discussing the distribution of methamphetamine and collection of drug debts. In many of the communications, Martin and co-conspirators used coded language to disguise their drug trafficking activities. Through their investigation, agents learned that Martin was responsible for the distribution of ounce quantities of methamphetamine to various customers in the Western District of Arkansas. Additionally, during the course of the investigation, agents conducted numerous controlled purchases of methamphetamine from Martin. During the course of those controlled buys, Martin sent various co-conspirators to deliver the methamphetamine on his behalf. As a result of this investigation, agents seized over three pounds of methamphetamine, five firearms, and approximately $160,000 in cash. Martin and his co-conspirators were originally charged in a 15-count indictment by a Federal Grand Jury which was filed on March 6, 2013. Martin pleaded guilty to one count of Conspiracy to Distribute Methamphetamine on December 11, 2013. During sentencing, it was determined that Martin was an organizer or leader of a criminal activity that involved five or more participants and that Martin possessed a dangerous weapon during the commission of the offense.

After charging 24 individuals with state and federal crimes involving large scale drug trafficking in relation to Martin, Eldridge emphasized the importance of "identifying, investigating, and prosecuting drug trafficking organizations in South Arkansas and throughout the Western District." Eldridge went on to ensure that "those who bring this illegal activity onto our streets" will be "held accountable so that Arkansans can have confidence that our streets are safe.".

In April 2015, Eldridge announced that Jamie B. Martin, age 36, of Waldo, Arkansas, was sentenced to 240 months in prison followed by three years of supervised release on one count of Conspiracy to Distribute Methamphetamine as part of “Operation Crystal Clear”, an investigation into large-scale drug trafficking of methamphetamine throughout Columbia County, Arkansas, and surrounding areas.

Upon sentencing, Eldridge commented, “With the sentence announced today, another drug trafficking organization has been successfully dismantled, and its leader brought to justice. The criminal activity involved in this case victimized the people of Waldo, Magnolia, and the surrounding area. Our office remains committed to vigilantly and aggressively prosecuting drug trafficking organizations across the Western District of Arkansas in order to eradicate the crime and violence they bring into our communities.”

Frank Maybee and Sean Popejoy
In the early morning hours of June 20, 2010, Frank Maybee and Sean Popejoy of Green Forest, Arkansas, targeted five Hispanic men who had pulled into a gas station parking lot. Though Maybee and Popejoy did not know the men and the five did not do or say anything to provoke them, Maybee and Popejoy yelled racial epithets at the men and told them to “go back to Mexico.” The co-conspirators pursued them in Maybee’s truck when the victims drove away. When Maybee and Popejoy caught up to the victims, Popejoy leaned outside of the front passenger window, waived a tire wrench at the victims, and continued to threaten and hurl racial epithets at the victims. Maybee, driving his truck, rammed into the victims’ car repeatedly, causing the victims’ car to cross the opposite lane of traffic, go off the road, crash into a tree and ignite. The victims were severely injured, and one of the victims sustained life-threatening injuries.

Eldridge strongly condemned the actions of Maybee and Popejoy, saying, "Acts of violence that occur simply because of how someone looks are horrific. The five victims in this case were targeted because they are Hispanic. That is reprehensible." In 2011, Maybee and Popejoy were charged with a federal hate crime and found guilty by a federal jury. The federal jury convicted Maybee of five counts of committing a federal hate crime and one count of conspiring to commit a federal hate crime and Popejoy of one count of committing a federal hate crime and one count of conspiring to commit a federal hate crime. Upon news of the verdict, Eldridge said, "We thank the jury – 12 individuals from communities across Northern Arkansas - for their careful consideration of the evidence and for holding the defendants accountable for their actions. We hope that acts like this never occur." Eldridge maintained that justice would be sought in such instances, adding, "However, if they do, we will vigorously prosecute them.”

US District Judge Jimm Hendren sentenced Maybee to 11 years in prison and Popejoy to 4 years in prison. Eldridge noted that Maybee and Popejoy were the first individuals sentenced under the Matthew Shepard and James Byrd, Jr. Hate Crimes Prevention Act, an Act of Congress that bolstered prosecution of hate crimes in 2009.

U.S. Senate campaign

In 2015, Eldridge announced that he would challenge incumbent Republican John Boozman in the 2016 election to the United States Senate. Eldridge entered the race to work with and for Arkansans, and he positioned himself as a candidate with a fresh perspective and an independent voice. Eldridge said he planned to serve and make a difference for Arkansans that are increasingly "frustrated with a Washington that seems further and further removed from the real problems they face every day."

Eldridge's campaign focused on nonpartisanship and "getting things done." Eldridge attributed this focus to his "white-board" theory of governing. "That is," Eldridge explained, "that you check the party labels and the politics at the door. You walk in the room; you put a problem on the white board. You have an open, honest, intellectual discussion about what the possible solutions to that problem are. You discuss the pluses and minuses of each solution. You come up with the best solution to the problem. That’s what ought to be implemented via legislation. That is not a partisan exercise."

Political positions

During his campaign, Eldridge promised as a US Senator he would prioritize job creation, education and the national debt, among other issues. Specifically, Eldridge drew attention to the national deficit and debt. "We know that we've got $18 trillion in debt and that debt has tripled from the time my opponent took office," Eldridge said. "It is time we start doing something about it now."

Drawing from his experience as a prosecutor and US Attorney, Eldridge said that if elected to the US Senate, he would introduce legislation that would increase the maximum sentence for child predators, including first-time offenders, to life in prison. This would include criminals who sexually abuse children and those criminals who produce images of minors engaging in sexually explicit conduct.

In response to President Barack Obama's Executive Order on guns, Eldridge, a strong advocate for the Second Amendment, issued a statement encouraging the United States Congress to secure and defend the rights of lawful gun owners under the Second Amendment; enforce the gun laws already on the books; and make it tougher for criminals, those with mental health conditions, and terrorists, to obtain weapons.

References

External links
 Conner Eldridge for Senate campaign website

1977 births
Arkansas Democrats
Arkansas lawyers
Davidson College alumni
Living people
Politicians from Fayetteville, Arkansas
United States Attorneys for the Western District of Arkansas
University of Arkansas School of Law alumni
Candidates in the 2016 United States Senate elections
21st-century American lawyers